This is a list of genera in the subfamily Hydroporinae.

Hydroporinae genera

 Africodytes Biström, 1988
 Agnoshydrus Biström, Nilsson and Wewalka, 1997
 Allodessus Guignot, 1953
 Allopachria Zimmermann, 1924
 Amarodytes Régimbart, 1900
 Andex Sharp, 1882
 Anginopachria Wewalka, Balke and Hendrich, 2001
 Anodocheilus Babington, 1841
 Antiporus Sharp, 1882
 Barretthydrus Lea, 1927
 Bidessodes Régimbart, 1900
 Bidessonotus Régimbart, 1895
 Bidessus Sharp, 1882
 Boreonectes 
 Borneodessus Balke, Hendrich, Mazzoldi and Biström, 2002
 Brachyvatus Zimmermann, 1919
 Calicovatellus K. B. Miller and Lubkin, 2001
 Canthyporus Zimmermann, 1919
 Carabhydrus Watts, 1978
 Celina Aubé, 1837
 Chostonectes Sharp, 1880
 Clypeodytes Régimbart, 1894
 Coelambus 
 Coelhydrus Sharp, 1882
 Comaldessus Spangler & Barr, 1995
 Crinodessus K. B. Miller, 1997
 Darwinhydrus Sharp, 1882
 Deronectes Sharp, 1882
 Derovatellus Sharp, 1882
 Desmopachria Babington, 1841
 Dimitshydrus Uéno, 1996
 Ereboporus K. B. Miller, Gibson and Alarie, 2009
 Fontidessus K. B. Miller and Spangler, 2008
 Geodessus Brancucci, 1979
 Gibbidessus Watts, 1978
 Glareadessus Wewalka and Biström, 1998
 Graptodytes Seidlitz, 1887
 Haedeoporus 
 Haideoporus Young and Longley, 1976
 Hemibidessus Zimmermann, 1921
 Heroceras Guignot, 1950
 Herophydrus Sharp, 1880
 Heterhydrus Fairmaire, 1869
 Heterosternuta Strand, 1935
 Hovahydrus Biström, 1982
 Huxelhydrus Sharp, 1882
 Hydrocolus Roughley & Larson in Larson, Alarie & Roughley, 2000
 Hydrodessus J. Balfour-Browne, 1953
 Hydroglyphus Motschulsky, 1853
 Hydropeplus Sharp, 1882
 Hydroporus Clairville, 1806
 Hydrovatus Motschulsky, 1853
 Hygrotus Stephens, 1828
 Hyphoporus Sharp, 1880
 Hyphovatus Wewalka and Biström, 1994
 Hyphydrus Illiger, 1802
 Hypodessus Guignot, 1939
 Iberoporus Castro and Delgado, 2001
 Kakadudessus Hendrich and Balke, 2009
 Kuschelydrus Ordish, 1976
 Laccornellus Roughley and Wolfe, 1987
 Laccornis Gozis, 1914
 Leiodytes Guignot, 1936
 Limbodessus Guignot, 1939
 Liodessus Guignot, 1939
 Lioporeus Guignot, 1950
 Megaporus Brinck, 1943
 Metaporus Guignot, 1945
 Methles Sharp, 1882
 Microdessus Young, 1967
 Microdytes J. Balfour-Browne, 1946
 Morimotoa Uéno, 1957
 Nebrioporus Régimbart, 1906
 Necterosoma W. J. MacLeay, 1871
 Neobidessodes Hendrich and Balke in Hendrich, Hawlitschek and Balke, 2009
 Neobidessus Young, 1967
 Neoclypeodytes Young, 1967
 Neonectes J. Balfour-Browne, 1944
 Neoporus Guignot, 1931
 Oreodytes Seidlitz, 1887
 Pachydrus Sharp, 1882
 Pachynectes Régimbart, 1903
 Papuadessus Balke, 2001
 Paroster Sharp, 1882
 Peschetius Guignot, 1942
 Phreatodessus Ordish, 1976
 Platydytes Biström, 1988
 Porhydrus Guignot, 1945
 Primospes Sharp, 1882
 Pseuduvarus Biström, 1988
 Queda Sharp, 1882
 Rhithrodytes Bameul, 1989
 Sanfilippodytes Franciscolo, 1979
 Scarodytes Gozis, 1914
 Sekaliporus Watts, 1997
 Sharphydrus Omer-Cooper, 1958
 Siamoporus Spangler, 1996
 Siettitia Abeille de Perrin, 1904
 Sinodytes Spangler, 1996
 Sternopriscus Sharp, 1880
 Stictonectes Brinck, 1943
 Stictotarsus Zimmermann, 1919
 Stygoporus Larson and LaBonte, 1994
 Suphrodytes Gozis, 1914
 Tepuidessus Spangler, 1981
 Terradessus Watts, 1982
 Tiporus Watts, 1985
 Trichonectes Guignot, 1941
 Trogloguignotus Sanfilippo, 1958
 Tyndallhydrus Sharp, 1882
 Typhlodessus Brancucci, 1985
 Uvarus Guignot, 1939
 Vatellus Aubé, 1837
 Yola Gozis, 1886
 Yolina Guignot, 1936

References